The Buenos Aires Central Post Office (native name: "Palacio de Correos y Telecomunicaciones" or most commonly, "Correo Central") building, now the Kirchner Cultural Centre, was the seat of the Correo Argentino (Argentine Post Office Department) until 2005. It is located in the San Nicolás, Buenos Aires neighborhood of Buenos Aires, Argentina.

The building was designed in the Neoclassical Beaux-Arts style and with Second Empire style elements by French architect Norbert Maillart.
Construction started in 1899, and after several long pauses and changes to Maillart's original design, was finally opened in 1928.

The Palacio de Correos was declared National Heritage in 1997 due to its architectural style, historical relevance and the artworks inside the building. It ceased activities as a post office in 2003 and two years later the National Government called a tender to turn the building into a cultural centre as part of the celebrations to commemorate the 200th. anniversary of May Revolution. The first name chosen was "Centro Cultural del Bicentenario", changing to "Néstor Kirchner Cultural Centre" in 2012.

The Central Post Office building, after extensive renovations, construction, and restoration, now houses the Néstor Kirchner Cultural Centre, which opened in May 2015. It is the largest cultural center in Latin America, and 4th largest in the world.

History

Original project 

Due to the increasing demand for post services in Argentina, in 1888 the Post Office director, Ramón Cárcano, proposed a specific building as seat for the Postal Service. The Ministry of Public Works hired French architect Norbert-Auguste Maillart to design the building and carry out the project. Maillart's concept building was based on the City Hall Post Office of New York City.

Once the project received approval from the president Miguel Juárez Celman, Maillart started works in 1889 on land given by the society Las Catalinas, sited on the block among Leandro N. Alem Ave., Corrientes Ave., Bouchard and Sarmiento streets. Works were interrupted in 1890 because of the economic crash that caused the fall of president Juárez Celman.

Modifications 
It was not until 1905 when the National government released funds to finish the building. Many years had passed and the original project by Maillart involved a smaller building became obsolete due to the increasing demand for postal services. Therefore, the post director Ernesto Bosch, proposed a new design for the building and Maillart was hired again in 1908 to carry out the new project.

Unlike the previous project, the new building would have an entrance on Sarmiento street. To facilitate access to building for people, it was planned to build bridges and pedestrian areas, installed on arches and columns that would join the upper border of the 25 de Mayo street with the entrances of the building. Besides, inclined planes would be placed to connect those streets with Leandro N. Alem avenue. Some surrounding buildings, such as the Stock Exchange of Buenos Aires and the Calvet Building were constructed according to that project that finally was never carried out.

Final version 
In 1911 Maillart retired from the project in disagreement with the authorities. The National Direction of Architecture appointed Maillart's main collaborator, Russian Jacques Spolsky to continue the project. Spolsky had already designed the Palacio de Correos of Tucumán and its homonym of Rosario.

After Spolsky was designated the original project was significantly modified. Some of the changes included a metallic structure and the use of materials such as cement. Due to the land having been reclaimed from the Río de la Plata, it was necessary to sink 2,882  concrete piles to avoid problems with the foundations.

In 1916, one year after the company hired for the construction of the building transferred the contract to Public Works General Company, the executive authority suspended the construction of the bridges and inclined planes due to the economic crisis and the lack of materials due to the World War I. As a result, some concepts of the palace had to be changed. The picture windows on the second floor (Sarmiento street side) had been originally conceived as entrances, therefore mezzanines were added while some floors were demolished to convert first and second basements into main hall entrances, putting the windows there.

Funds ran out in 1923 so a new law as promulgated to grant new funds, while works were awarded to a new company. The building was finally inaugurated on September 28, 1928, two weeks before then president of Argentina Marcelo T. de Alvear finished his term.

During the first terms of president Juan Perón, he and his wife Eva Perón had their offices at the Buenos Aires Central Post Office. The Eva Perón Foundation also used the building as its headquarters.in 1997, the Palacio de Correos was declared National Heritage by Law 12,665, considering its architectural style and historic relevance. In 2002 the building ceased operations as seat of Correo Argentino. Only a small part of the building continued its activities as a post office and sale of stamps, on Sarmiento Street.

Kirchner Cultural Center
The building became inactive in 2005, also when President Néstor Kirchner saw the opportunity for the abandoned building to become a major cultural center.  After 9 years of construction it opened in 2015 as the Néstor Kirchner Cultural Centre.

See also 

 Correo Argentino

References

External links

 Centro Cultural Kirchner, current occupant

Buildings and structures in Buenos Aires
Government buildings in Argentina
National Historic Monuments of Argentina
Post office buildings
Government buildings completed in 1928
1928 establishments in Argentina
Tourist attractions in Buenos Aires
Beaux-Arts architecture
Neoclassical architecture in Argentina
Second Empire architecture